(born September 23, 1964 in Tsuyama, Okayama) is a Japanese vocalist, multi-instrumentalist and songwriter. He is best known as the singer and lyricist of the rock duo B'z, the best-selling music act in their native Japan. He has also had a successful solo career, with five studio albums and five singles topping the Japanese music charts. He collaborated with Slash on single "Sahara" which was released in 2009. In 2017, he released a collaborative album, Chubby Groove, with Stevie Salas under the name "Inaba/Salas".

Early life 

Koshi Inaba was born and raised in Tsuyama, Okayama, and enrolled in Yokohama National University's Faculty for Education in 1983 to become a qualified mathematics teacher. Inaba made his musical debut in 1985 whilst still a student, contributing vocals to Toshiya "Ran" Matsukawa's album Burning ~Dedication to Randy Rhoads~ under the stage name Mr. Crazy Tiger. He graduated in 1987 when he also formed a short-lived band.

B'z and solo career 

Beginning with B'z in 1988, Inaba has, together with guitarist Tak Matsumoto, continued to release new material and tour as part of B'z almost every year since. He has also periodically released solo material, starting in 1997 with the album Magma, produced whilst B'z were on a brief hiatus. It was one of the albums to receive the "Best Rock Album of the Year" award at the 12th Japan Gold Disc Awards. Unlike in B'z, where he contributes only lyrics, Inaba has composed the music for his solo releases. All his studio albums and singles until now have topped the Oricon music charts. Additionally, the first studio album with 1,001,160 sold copies was the 21st best-selling album of the year, second Shian with 438,930 copies was the 39th in 2002, third Peace of Mind with 297,103 copies was 48th in 2004, fourth Hadou with 177,984 was 38th in 2010, and Singing Bird with 107,551 was certified Gold by RIAJ. As for singles, "Tooku Made" with 663,660 sold copies was the 28th best-selling single of the year 1999, "Ki" with 275,957 copies was 25th in 2003, "Wonderland" with 225,229 copies was 36th in 2004, "Okay" with 134,381 copies was 45th in 2010, and "Hane" was certified Gold and was 51st in 2016. His live video recordings also topped the charts, hence cumulatively, according to reported yearly sales and certifications he sold over 3.4 million records.

Inaba has also sung on other artists' releases, such as the Steve Vai song "Asian Sky" from the album The Ultra Zone in 1999. On September 29, 2009, it was announced that Inaba would be featured in Slash's 2010 solo album, Slash. Inaba sang on the first single, "Sahara", released on November 11, 2009, in Japan. The song, for which Inaba wrote the lyrics, was featured as the 15th track of the Japanese edition of the album. The single charted at #4 on the Oricon weekly singles chart. On February 24, 2010, it was announced that single "Sahara" won the Western "Single of the Year" award at Japan Gold Disc Award held by RIAJ. In 2017, Inaba released a collaborative album with Stevie Salas under the name "Inaba/Salas". The album, Chubby Groove, went to #2 in the Japanese album charts and was certified Gold by RIAJ.
Hiroshi Inaba takes care of his physical condition by not drinking alcohol and not using the air conditioning much during the tour to protect his throat.
Marty Friedman once listed Hiroshi Inaba as the best vocalist in the whole world. The reason for this, he says, is that his voice hasn't faded after more than 20 years of singing hard rock songs. He performed the Japanese dubbing voice for Clay Calloway in Sing 2.

Discography

Albums 
 Magma (マグマ) (January 29, 1997) Oricon ranking: #1
 Shian (志庵) (October 9, 2002) #1
 Peace of Mind (September 22, 2004) #1
 Hadou (ハドウ) (August 18, 2010) #1
 Singing Bird (May 21, 2014) #1

Singles 
 Tooku Made (遠くまで) (December 16, 1998) #1
 Ki (June 11, 2003) #1
 Wonderland (July 14, 2004) #1
 Okay (June 23, 2010) #1
 Hane (羽) (January 13, 2016) #1

Digital Exclusive Singles 
 Nensho (February 26, 2014)
 Nakinagara (March 26, 2014)
 Stay Free (April 23, 2014)
 Saturday (July 30, 2014)
 YELLOW (August 24, 2016)
 BANTAM (January 28, 2023)

Inaba/Salas
Chubby Groove (January 18, 2017) #2
Maximum Huavo (April 15, 2020) #1

Guest Appearances 
 Burning – "Ran", 1985 (as Mr. Crazy Tiger)
 The Ultra Zone (on "Asian Sky") – Steve Vai, 1999
 Slash ("Sahara") – Slash, 2010

Videography 
Live 2004 ~en~ (2004.12.22) #1
Live 2010 ~en II~ (2011.02.16) #1
Live 2014 ~en-ball~ (2015.11.18) #2
Live 2016 ~enIII~ (2016.08.03) #1

See also 
 B'z
 Tak Matsumoto

References

External links 
  

B'z
Japanese male rock singers
Japanese male pop singers
Japanese male singer-songwriters
English-language singers from Japan
1964 births
Living people
Being Inc. artists
People from Okayama Prefecture
Musicians from Okayama Prefecture
Yokohama National University alumni
20th-century Japanese male singers
21st-century Japanese male singers